Robert Marshall Rosengarden (April 23, 1924 – February 27, 2007) was an American jazz drummer and bandleader. A native of Elgin, Illinois, United States, he played on many recordings and in television orchestras and talk show bands.

Rosengarden began playing drums when he was 12, and later studied at the University of Michigan. After playing drums in Army bands in World War II, he moved to New York City, working in several groups between 1945 and 1948, before becoming a busy studio musician. He played at NBC-TV (1949–1968) and ABC (1969–1974) on  The Steve Allen Show, The Ernie Kovacs Show, Sing Along With Mitch, Johnny Carson's The Tonight Show Band, and led the band for The Dick Cavett Show.

Through the years, Rosengarden was an active studio musician, recording with Duke Ellington, Billie Holiday, Skitch Henderson, Quincy Jones, Peter Nero, Gil Evans, Miles Davis, Gerry Mulligan, Benny Goodman, Moondog, Dick Hyman, Arlo Guthrie, Carmen McRae, Ben E. King, Harry Belafonte, Barbra Streisand, Jimi Hendrix and Tony Bennett.

In later years, Rosengarden was most often heard as the drummer with a variety of all-star, swing-oriented groups, including Soprano Summit. He died of Alzheimer's disease in Sarasota, Florida, at the age of 82.

Personal life 
Robert "Bobby" Rosengarden was first married to Dorothy Kline and later remarried to Sharon Lee Rosier in 1985. Bobby is the father to two sons, Neil and Mark Rosengarden, who were raised in the village of Kings Point in Great Neck, New York. Rosengarden has four grandchildren.

Discography

As sideman 
With Stan Getz
What the World Needs Now: Stan Getz Plays Burt Bacharach and Hal David (Verve, 1968)
With J. J. Johnson
Goodies (RCA Victor, 1965)
With Oliver Nelson
Oliver Nelson Plays Michelle (Impulse!, 1966)
Encyclopedia of Jazz (Verve, 1966)
The Sound of Feeling (Verve, 1966)
With Jimmy Smith
Hoochie Coochie Man (Verve, 1966)
With Sylvia Syms
For Once in My Life (Prestige, 1967)
With Milt Hinton & Derek Smith
The Trio (Chiaroscuro, 1994)
With Bob Wilber & Kenny Davern
Summit Reunion (Chiaroscuro, 1989)
Summit Reunion 1992 (Chiaroscuro, 1992)With Walter WanderleyRain Forest (Verve, 1966)With Kai Winding'More Brass'' (Verve, 1966)

References

External links
All-Music Guide
The Dead Rock Stars Club
Tribute to Bobby Rosengarden - an unofficial site detailing Bobby's discography and career highlights

1924 births
2007 deaths
American jazz drummers
American jazz bandleaders
American jazz percussionists
Deaths from kidney failure
University of Michigan alumni
20th-century American drummers
American male drummers
Deaths from Alzheimer's disease
Deaths from dementia in Florida
20th-century American male musicians
American male jazz musicians
The Tonight Show Band members
World's Greatest Jazz Band members
United States Army personnel of World War II